Kalyn may refer to:

Kalyn Chapman, American model, TV host, beauty pageant titleholder from Alabama
Jannelle Kalyn Flaws (born 1991), American soccer player
Kalyn Free, American attorney, political candidate, tribal citizen of the Choctaw Nation of Oklahoma
Kalyn Heffernan, MC for the Krip Hop band Wheelchair Sports Camp
Kalyn Keller (born 1985), American former Olympic swimmer
Kalyn Ponga (born 1998), Australian professional rugby league footballer
Kalyn Schwartz (born 1989), American mixed martial artist